E. concinna may refer to:

 Emarginula concinna, a sea snail
 Eragrostis concinna, a true grass
 Eucalyptus concinna, a dicotyledon plant
 Euphonia concinna, a Colombian bird
 Eupithecia concinna, a Nepalese moth